Anatomy is the biological science concerned with the structure of living things

Anatomy may also refer to:
Human anatomy, the biological science concerned with the structure of the human body
Plant anatomy, the biological science concerned with the structure of plants
Anatomy (film), released in 2000, a German horror film
Anatomy 2, released in 2003, the sequel to the film Anatomy
Amatory anatomy, a style of English poetry
Anatomy (Stan Ridgway album), 1999
Anatomy (Drugstore album), 2011
"Anatomy", a song by The Devil Wears Prada from the EP Zombie
"Anatomic", a song by the Afro Celt Sound System from the album Volume 5: Anatomic
Project anatomy, a tool for integration planning that visualizes dependencies between work items in development projects
System anatomy, a systems development tool that visualizes the dependencies between system capabilities in (complex) systems

See also
Gray's Anatomy (disambiguation)